This is a list of all the notable places in Tandlianwala City, Pakistan, and its surrounding tourism attractions.

Major sites
The city has a number of sites of interest including several colonial-era buildings, a couple hindu mandir (temple), some sikh gurudwara, two major sports stadiums one of them is under construction and a public park.

 Tandlianwala Mahi Chowk
 Love Road
 Tandlianwala Railway Station
 Bilal Shaheed Park
 Dunga Ground, Cricket and Hockey Stadium
 Faisalabad Hockey Stadium
 Tandlianwala Library
 Punjab College, under construction 1 km from city on Faisalabad Road
 Jamia Umme Salmah Lil-Banat

Localities
 Hoche
 Mubarak Pura
 Iqbal Colony
 Hussain Abad
 Kachcha Tandla
 Sarwar Colony
 Rasool Pura
 Shammas Pura
 Raza Abad
 Mumtaz Abad
 Islam Pura
 Jinnah Colony
 Butt Colony
 Jalla Mor
 Taiba Town
 Nishat Town

Faisalabad District